The 2008 Big Sky Conference men's basketball tournament took place from March 8–12, 2008. The first round was held at campus sites. The semifinals and finals took place at the Rose Garden in Portland, Oregon. Teams would be re-seeded, if necessary, for the semifinal round. Portland State won the tournament. As a result, they advanced to the NCAA tournament.

Sources
Field Set for Men's Tourney

References

Big Sky Conference men's basketball tournament
Tournament
Big Sky Conference men's basketball tournament
Big Sky Conference men's basketball tournament
Basketball competitions in Portland, Oregon
College sports tournaments in Montana